The election of Members of Parliament (MPs) to the 5th Parliament of the Fourth Republic was held on 7 December 2008. The Speaker is not an elected member of parliament. There are a total of 230 constituencies in Ghana.

Current composition

List of MPs elected in the general election
The following table is a list of MPs elected on 7 December 2008, ordered by region and constituency. The previous MP and previous party column shows the MP and party holding the seat prior to the election.



Postponed polls
Parliamentary elections in the Akwatia constituencies had problems and were therefore deferred. The Supreme Court of Ghana ordered that the election be re-run in six polling stations. Following this, the collated results made Kofi Asare of the NPP the duly elected MP for the constituency.
Results for the Asutifi South were deferred but confirmed later with Collins Dauda being sworn in.

Changes
The MP for Kwabre West, Emmanuel Owusu-Ansah died on Friday 22 June 2012 after a short illness.
The MP for Bawku Central, Adamu Dramani Sakande was jailed for 2 years by the Supreme Court of Ghana for forgery on 27 July 2012. This follows a case brought in the High court by Mr Sumaila Biebel, a cattle dealer in 2009 stating that Dramani did not qualify to be an MP as he held both a British and a Burkinabé passport.
 Henry Ford Kamel, MP for Buem and Minister for the Volta Region in the Mahama NDC government died on 25 December 2012 at the Military Hospital in Accra following complications related to diabetes.

By-elections
Jirapa constituency - 7 April 2009 - Edward Salia NDC died after a period of illness necessitating this by-election. Francis Bawaana Dakurah of the NDC won the seat with a majority of 9,337 (59.0%) beating the NPP candidate and immediate past District Chief Executive, Justin Bayelah Dakurah to second place.
Chereponi constituency - 29 September 2009 - Doris Asibi Seidu died on 31 July 2009 after an illness. The Electoral Commission of Ghana organised a by-election for 29 September 2009. Samuel Abdulai Jabanyite (NDC) was declared the winner and duly elected MP.
Atiwa constituency - 31 August 2010 - A by-election was scheduled for 31 August 2010 following the death of Kwasi Annoh Ankama, NPP MP for Atiwa. He died during a trip to London. Kwesi Amoako Atta also of the NPP, won the seat with a vote of 20,282 (75%). This gave him a majority of 14,092 (52.1%).
Wulensi constituency - 31 July 2012 - Following the death of the independent MP Saani Iddi in early June, the Electoral Commission of Ghana set the above date for a by-election following registration of candidates on 3 July and 4 July 2012. All four contesting parties won an injunction in court to postpone the by-election as they wanted the Electoral Commission of Ghana to use the new voters' register which was being finalised rather than the old register used in previous elections.
Kwabre West constituency - The by-election planned for 14 August 2012 was postponed following a court order.

Notes and references

See also
2008 Ghanaian parliamentary election
Parliament of Ghana
Joyce Bamford-Addo - Speaker of the 5th parliament of the 4th Republic.

External links and sources

2008 parliamentary election results by region - Electoral Commission of Ghana
2008 parliamentary election results on MyJoyOnline
2008 parliamentary election results on  Ghana Home Page

2008